Friedland (Lower Sorbian: Bryland) is a town in the Oder-Spree district, in Brandenburg, Germany.

History

The town was first mentioned as Fredberg in a 1235 deed issued by the Lusatian margrave Henry III of Meissen. A 1301 contract signed by Margrave Frederick I named a town and castle of Vredeburch, then a possession of the Lords of Strehla, who served as ministeriales of the ruling House of Wettin. The present name first appeared in a 1350 bull issued by Pope Clement VI. With Lower Lusatia, Friedland passed under the suzerainty of the Bohemian Crown in 1367.

In 1518, the lordship was pawned to the Order of Saint John and turned Protestant in 1540. Under the rule of Lord Master Count Adam of Schwarzenberg, the fortifications were enlarged, nevertheless Friedland suffered severely under the impact of the Thirty Years' War. Upon the 1635 Peace of Prague, it passed with the Lusatias to the Electorate of Saxony. Under Master Prince John Maurice of Nassau-Siegen the lordship quickly recovered. Town privileges were confirmed in 1662, a Jewish community is documented since 1673.

After almost three-centuries rule of the Order of Saint John, Friedland was finally secularised to Saxony in 1811. Only four years later, the town passed to the Prussian province of Brandenburg upon the Final Act of the 1815 Vienna Congress.

Demography 

Friedland is the least densely populated town ("Stadt") in Germany, just narrowly beating Baruth/Mark (also in Brandenburg) for that distinction.

References

Localities in Oder-Spree